Michael Durso is an American politician serving as a member of the New York State Assembly from the 9th district. Elected in November 2020, he assumed office on January 6, 2021.

Early life 
Durso was born in Nassau County, New York and raised in the town of Massapequa Park. Growing up, Durso's parents worked multiple jobs to support the family. After graduating from high school, Durso became a sanitation worker.

Career 
Prior to entering politics, Durso has worked as a sanitation supervisor. He is a member of CSEA Local 881. He previously worked as a public safety officer at Hofstra University. Durso was elected to the New York State Assembly in November 2020 and assumed office on January 6, 2021.

References 

Living people
People from Nassau County, New York
People from Massapequa Park, New York
Republican Party members of the New York State Assembly
1979 births